James, Jim or Jimmy Webb may refer to:

Arts
Jim Webb (born 1946), American author, also politician (see below)
James Webb (historian) (1946–1980), Scottish historian 
James Webb (painter) (1825–1895), British painter
James Webb (South African artist) (born 1975), South African artist known for sound installations
James R. Webb (1909–1974), American screenplay writer
Jim Webb (audio engineer), American film audio engineer
Jim Webb (poet), American poet, playwright, and essayist
Jimmy Webb (born 1946), American musician
J. Watson Webb Jr. (1916–2000), American film editor
Jim Webb (Family Affairs), a fictional character in UK soap opera Family Affairs
Jimmy Webb (stylist) (1957–2020), American punk fashion stylist

Public service
James E. Webb (1906–1992), American official, the second Administrator of the National Aeronautics and Space Administration (NASA), namesake of the James Webb Space Telescope
James Webb (Royal Navy officer) (died 1761), commodore governor for the Canadian province of Newfoundland and Labrador for 1760
J. B. Webb (James B. Webb, 1929–2009), influential in shaping Australia's international relations and aid during the 1950s, 60s and 70s
Jim Webb (born 1946), former Senator from Virginia, former U.S. Secretary of the Navy, and 2016 Presidential candidate
James H. Webb (jurist), early 20th century Yale University lecturer in law; cowrote Outlines of Criminal Law with Courtney Kenny
James L. Webb (1854–1930), North Carolina judge and politician
James Watson Webb (1802–1884), American newspaper publisher and New York politician
Jim Webb (Canadian politician), founding member of the New Brunswick Confederation of Regions Party
James Webb (Texas politician) (1792–1856), Attorney General in the Republic of Texas, Secretary of State for the State of Texas
James Webb (Australian politician) (1887–1939), member of the New South Wales Legislative Assembly
James C. Webb, member of the New Hampshire House of Representatives

Sports
James Webb (rugby union) (1863–1913), Wales rugby international player
Skeeter Webb (James Laverne Webb, 1909–1986), Major League Baseball player
Jim Webb (judo) (James R. Webb), president of the United States Judo Association
Jim Webb (rugby) (1878–1955), Welsh rugby international player
Jimmy Webb (American football) (born 1952), American football player
James Watson Webb II (1884–1960), American polo champion
Jimmy Webb (climber) (born 1987), rock climber specializing in bouldering
James Webb III (born 1993), American professional basketball player

See also
James Webb Space Telescope, an infrared space-based telescope named after James E. Webb
James Webbe (died 1557), MP for Devizes
James Webb (Medal of Honor) (1841–1915) Medal of Honor Recipient